Halfway Houses is a village on the Isle of Sheppey in the Swale borough of Kent in England. It derives its name from the pub in the village centre, with the same name, which was so named because it is halfway between Minster and Sheerness, before the coastal road was built along the north coast connecting Minster and Sheerness. It is bordered to the west by the town of Queenborough and the village of Minster-on-Sea, and to the east by the town of Minster. It is one mile south of the town of Sheerness. It is in the Queenborough and Halfway ward of Swale Borough Council.

References

External links

Villages in Kent
Unparished areas in Kent
Isle of Sheppey